Bako Sahaki Sahakyan (born 30 August 1960) is an Artsakhi politician who served as the third president of the de facto-independent Republic of Artsakh from 2007 to 2020. He is the longest-serving president of Artsakh.

He was first elected as President on 19 July 2007. On 19 July 2012, he was re-elected for a second five-year term, receiving approximately two-thirds of the votes. In 2017, he was re-elected indirectly for a three-year term. Sahakyan replaced Arkadi Ghukasyan, who had held the presidential post for two five-year terms.

Sahakyan was born on 30 August 1960 in Stepanakert, capital of the Nagorno-Karabakh Autonomous Oblast within the Azerbaijan SSR. After serving in the Soviet Army, he worked for nine years in a Stepanakert factory. In 1990, he joined the Nagorno-Karabakh Defense Army, of which he became a deputy commander. In 1999, he was named interior minister of Nagorno-Karabakh. He also led the Nagorno-Karabakh security service from 2001 to June 2007, when he resigned in order to run in the 2007 Nagorno-Karabakh presidential election.

Sahakyan ran as an independent and won the elections with 85 percent of the votes. Voters mainly turned to Sahakyan because of his record in the security services. He pledged to seek full independence for Artsakh, using the example of international recognition of Kosovo as an independent state, which he said would pave the way for acceptance of Artsakh's sovereignty. He was re-elected for a second five-year term in 2012 and then indirectly by Artsakh's National Assembly in 2017 for a three-year term. He was succeeded by Arayik Harutyunyan, who previously served as Sahakyan's prime minister, in 2020.

Sahakyan is married and has two children.

His name is sometimes transcribed as Bako Sahakian or Saakian.

See also
President of Artsakh
Artsakh
Arkadi Ghukasyan

References

External links
Official website of the President of the Nagorno Karabagh Republic
High turnout in Nagorno-Karabakh

1959 births
Living people
Stepanakert
People from Stepanakert
Armenian military personnel of the Nagorno-Karabakh War
Armenian nationalists
Presidents of the Republic of Artsakh
Artsakh military personnel
Artsakh University alumni